Okkelberg Chapel is a parish church of the Church of Norway in Stjørdal municipality in Trøndelag county, Norway. It is located in the village of Skjelstadmarka. It is one of the churches for the Hegra parish which is part of the Stjørdal prosti (deanery) in the Diocese of Nidaros. The white, wooden church was built in a long church style in 1905 using plans drawn up by the architect Ole Andresen. The church seats about 200 people.

History
A royal decree on 11 June 1904 granted permission for the parish to build a chapel here. The chapel was designed by Ole Andresen as a wooden long church with a west tower and a choir in the east. There is a sacristy on both the north and south sides of the choir. The new chapel was completed in 1905 and it was formally consecrated in September 1906.

See also
List of churches in Nidaros

References

Stjørdal
Churches in Trøndelag
Long churches in Norway
Wooden churches in Norway
20th-century Church of Norway church buildings
Churches completed in 1905
1905 establishments in Norway